In mathematics, a Countryman line (named after Roger Simmons Countryman Jr.) is an uncountable linear ordering whose square is the union of countably many chains. The existence of Countryman lines was first proven by Shelah. Shelah also conjectured that, assuming PFA, every Aronszajn line contains a Countryman line. This conjecture, which remained open for three decades, was proven by Justin Moore.

References
 
 
 Roger S. Countryman, Jr. Spaces having a -monotone base. Preprint, 1970.

Order theory